Mistake Peak is a summit in Gila County, in the U.S. state of Arizona. Mistake Peak was likely so named because it was mistaken by surveyors for another summit. Mistake Peak has been noted for its unusual place name.

References

Mountains of Arizona
Mountains of Gila County, Arizona